Jim Howell is an American politician who served in the Kansas House of Representatives as a Republican from 2011 to 2014. He was initially elected to the 82nd district, winning easily in the general election with 73% of the vote. In 2012, he ran for re-election in the 81st district due to redistricting and won an additional term with 65% of the vote. He declined to run for re-election to the state legislature in 2014. As of 2023, Howell serves as a member of the Sedgwick County Commission.

References

Living people
Year of birth missing (living people)
Republican Party members of the Kansas House of Representatives
21st-century American politicians
Politicians from Wichita, Kansas
County commissioners in Kansas